Osteodiscus is a genus of snailfishes native to the Pacific Ocean.

Species
There are currently three recognized species in this genus:
 Osteodiscus andriashevi Pitruk & Fedorov, 1990
 Osteodiscus cascadiae Stein, 1978 (Bigtail snailfish)
 Osteodiscus rhepostomias Stein, 2012

References

Liparidae